"Alligator Sky" is a song by American electronica project Owl City from his third studio album All Things Bright and Beautiful. It was released as the lead single from the album on April 12, 2011. Four versions of the song were released: The first features Californian rapper Shawn Chrystopher, the second version omits Chrystopher's vocals, a third version featuring Atlanta rapper B.o.B leaked online, and a fourth version featuring vocals by Big Boi of Atlanta hip-hop duo OutKast also leaked online.

Background
Adam Young stated in an interview with AOL that he experimented with different sounds on the album All Things Bright and Beautiful and that "Alligator Sky" is where he 'pulled the hip-hop vibe, stating; "... I am a big fan of the way hip-hop music is put together and everything that goes into it—being so beat-heavy and just focusing on the rhythm side of it, sometimes more than melody. But I wanted to marry those two ideas and just focus on the rhythm side of it then have this rapper do verses just as a new look to it."

Explaining the concept of the title of the song, he stated, "It's about how there are so many weird things coming at you every day. Why not just meet them head on and take charge even though you have no say over what’s going to happen? You and those around you are what matter most."

Music video
A music video for the first version of the song was released on May 6 and was made by Endeavor Media. Young uploaded 'Behind the Scenes' footage of the video a few days prior to the release on April 22, which explained the concept for the video; saying that it's about two men (Young and Chrystopher) leaving earth, but unlike many videos with a similar theme, they aren't leaving a post-apocalyptic earth, instead, there is a big celebration about leaving a very polluted earth. In the video the earth is shown as a planet that has terrible living conditions. The celebration is because they are leaving earth to find a better planet in outer space. As shown in the music video the duo are taking samples of earth with them to outer space to archive them.

Young's "Alligator Sky" self makes an appearance at the end of the music video for "Deer in the Headlights" where he is nearly run over by himself driving the DeLorean (from Back to the Future) after coming to the year 2015.

Track listing

Charts

References

External links

2011 singles
Owl City songs
Synth-pop songs
2011 songs
Songs written by Adam Young
Universal Republic Records singles
Songs written by B.o.B
Songs written by Big Boi